The Palazzo Ramirez de Montalvo, also known as Palazzo Matteucci is a palace located on Borgo degli Albizi #26 in central Florence, region of Tuscany Italy.

The palace was designed by the architect Bartolomeo Ammanati.

References

External links

Palaces in Florence